WestfalenBahn is a railway company operating regional train service in Lower Saxony and North Rhine-Westphalia, Northern Germany. It was founded in 2005 by Essener Versorgungs & Verkehrsgesellschaft, Minden Museum Railway, moBiel and Verkehrsbetriebe Extertal, each having a 25% share. In 2008 Essener Versorgungs & Verkehrsgesellschaft's share was sold to Abellio Deutschland. In July 2017 Abellio bought out the other shareholders.

Services
WestfalenBahn has operated routes RB61, RB65, RB66 and RB72 since 9 December 2007. These will pass to Eurobahn in December 2017. These are operated by a fleet of fourteen 3-car and five 5-car Stadler Flirts.

Local services  Wiehengebirgs-Bahn: Bad Bentheim - Rheine - Osnabrück - Bünde - Herford - Bielefeld
Local services  Ems-Bahn: Rheine - Münster
Local services  Teuto-Bahn: Osnabrück - Münster
Local services  Ostwestfalen-Bahn: Herford - Lage - Detmold - Altenbeken - Paderborn

On 13 December 2015 WestfalenBahn commenced a 15-year contract to operate the RE15, RE60 and RE70 services. To operate these services, 15 Stadler Flirt and 13 Stadler Kisses were leased from Alpha Trains.

Regional services  Emsland-Express: Emden - Leer - Lingen - Rheine - Münster
Regional services  Ems-Leine-Express: Rheine - Osnabrück - Löhne - Minden - Hanover - Braunschweig
Regional services  Weser-Leine-Express: Bielefeld - Herford - Löhne - Minden - Hanover - Braunschweig

Fleet

References

External links

Abellio (transport company)
Railway companies established in 2005
Railway companies of Germany
2005 establishments in Germany